Medicinal fungi are fungi that contain metabolites or can be induced to produce metabolites through biotechnology to develop prescription drugs. Compounds successfully developed into drugs or under research include antibiotics, anti-cancer drugs, cholesterol and ergosterol synthesis inhibitors, psychotropic drugs, immunosuppressants and fungicides.

History

Although fungi products have long been used in traditional medicine, the ability to identify beneficial properties and then extract the active ingredient started with the discovery of penicillin by Alexander Fleming in 1928. Since that time, many potential antibiotics were discovered and the potential for various fungi to synthesize biologically active molecules useful in various clinical therapies has been under research. Pharmacological research identified antifungal, antiviral, and antiprotozoan compounds from fungi.

Ganoderma lucidum, known in Chinese as líng zhī ("spirit plant"), and in Japanese as mannentake ("10,000-year mushroom"), has been well studied. Another species of  genus Ganoderma, G. applanatum, remains under basic research. Inonotus obliquus was used in Russia as early as the 16th century, and it featured in Alexandr Solzhenitsyn's 1967 novel Cancer Ward.

Research and drug development

Cancer

Paclitaxel is synthesised using Penicillium raistrickii and plant cell fermentation. Fungi can synthesize other mitotic inhibitors including vinblastine, vincristine, podophyllotoxin, griseofulvin, aurantiamine, oxaline, and neoxaline.

11,11'-Dideoxyverticillin A, an isolate of marine Penicillium, was used to create dozens of semi-synthetic, candidate anticancer compounds. 11,11'-Dideoxyverticillin A, andrastin A, barceloneic acid A, and barceloneic acid B, are farnesyl transferase inhibitors that can be made by Penicillium. 3-O-Methylfunicone, anicequol, duclauxin, and rubratoxin B, are anticancer/cytotoxic metabolites of Penicillium.

Penicillium is a potential source of the leukemia medicine asparaginase.

Some countries have approved beta-glucan fungal extracts lentinan, polysaccharide-K, and polysaccharide peptide as immunologic adjuvants. Evidence suggests this use as effective in prolonging and improving the quality of life for patients with certain cancers, although the Memorial Sloan-Kettering Cancer Center observes that "well designed, large scale studies are needed to establish the role of lentinan as a useful adjunct to cancer treatment". According to Cancer Research UK, "there is currently no evidence that any type of mushroom or mushroom extract can prevent or cure cancer". Fungal metabolites such as ergosterol, clavilactones, and triterpenoids are efficient Cdk inhibitors that lead to G1/S or G2/M arrest of cancer cells. Other metabolites, such as panepoxydone, are inhibitors of NF-κB. Fucose and mannose fragments of fungal cell wall are antagonists of VEGF-receptors.

Antibacterial agents (antibiotics)

Alexander Fleming led the way to the beta-lactam antibiotics with the Penicillium mold and penicillin. Subsequent discoveries included alamethicin, aphidicolin, brefeldin A, cephalosporin, cerulenin, citromycin, eupenifeldin, fumagillin, fusafungine, fusidic acid, helvolic acid, itaconic acid, MT81, nigrosporin B,  usnic acid, verrucarin A, vermiculine and many others.

Antibiotics retapamulin, tiamulin, and valnemulin are derivatives of the fungal metabolite pleuromutilin. Plectasin, austrocortilutein, austrocortirubin, coprinol, oudemansin A, strobilurin, illudin, pterulone, and sparassol are under research for their potential antibiotic activity.

Cholesterol biosynthesis inhibitors

Statins are an important class of cholesterol-lowering drugs; the first generation of statins were derived from fungi. Lovastatin, the first commercial statin, was extracted from a fermentation broth of Aspergillus terreus. Industrial production is now capable of producing 70 mg lovastatin per kilogram of substrate. The red yeast rice fungus, Monascus purpureus, can synthesize lovastatin, mevastatin, and the simvastatin precursor monacolin J.  Nicotinamide riboside, a cholesterol biosynthesis inhibitor, is made by Saccharomyces cerevisiae.

Antifungals

Some antifungals are derived or extracted from other fungal species. Griseofulvin is derived from a number of Penicillium species; caspofungin is derived from Glarea lozoyensis. Strobilurin, azoxystrobin, micafungin, and echinocandins, are all extracted from fungi. Anidulafungin is a derivative of an Aspergillus metabolite.

Antivirals 

Many mushrooms contain potential antiviral compounds remaining under preliminary research, such as: Lentinus edodes, Ganoderma lucidum, Ganoderma colossus, Hypsizygus marmoreus, Cordyceps militaris, Grifola frondosa, Scleroderma citrinum, Flammulina velutipes, and Trametes versicolor, Fomitopsis officinalis.

Immunosuppressants

Cyclosporin was discovered in Tolypocladium inflatum, while Bredinin was found in Eupenicillium brefeldianum and mycophenolic acid in Penicillium stoloniferum. Thermophilic fungi were the source of the fingolimod precursor myriocin. Aspergillus synthesizes immunosuppressants gliotoxin and endocrocin. Subglutinols are immunosuppressants isolated from Fusarium subglutinans.

Malaria

Codinaeopsin, efrapeptins, zervamicins, and antiamoebin are made by fungi, and remain under basic research.

Diabetes

Many fungal isolates act as DPP-4 inhibitors, alpha-glucosidase inhibitors, and alpha amylase inhibitors in laboratory studies. Ternatin is a fungal isolate that may affect hyperglycemia.

Psychotropic effects

Numerous fungi have well-documented psychotropic effects, some of them severe and associated with acute and life-threatening side-effects. Among these is Amanita muscaria, the fly agaric. More widely used informally are a range of fungi collectively known as "magic mushrooms", which contain psilocybin and psilocin.

The history of bread-making records deadly ergotism caused by ergot, most commonly Claviceps purpurea, a parasite of cereal crops. Psychoactive ergot alkaloid drugs have subsequently been extracted from or synthesised starting from ergot; these include ergotamine, dihydroergotamine, ergometrine, ergocristine, ergocryptine, ergocornine, methysergide, bromocriptine, cabergoline, and pergolide.

Vitamin D2

Fungi are a source of ergosterol which can be converted to vitamin D2 upon exposure to ultraviolet light.

Yeasts

The yeast Saccharomyces is used industrially to produce the amino acid lysine, as well as recombinant proteins insulin and hepatitis B surface antigen. Transgenic yeasts are used to produce artemisinin, as well as insulin analogs. Candida is used industrially to produce vitamins ascorbic acid and riboflavin. Pichia is used to produce the amino acid tryptophan and the vitamin pyridoxine. Rhodotorula is used to produce the amino acid phenylalanine. Moniliella is used industrially to produce the sugar alcohol erythritol.

References

External links 
 Memorial Sloan-Kettering Agaricus subrufescens, Phellinus linteus, Ganoderma lucidum, Trametes versicolor and PSK, Grifola frondosa, Inonotus obliquus, Pleurotus ostreatus, Cordyceps, Shiitake, Lentinan, AHCC.
 American Cancer Society Trametes versicolor and PSK, Grifola frondosa , Shiitake .
 National Cancer Institute Shiitake, Lentinan,  Cordycepin

 
Chemotherapy
Cancer
Antibiotics
Immunosuppressants
Antifungals
Antiparasitic agents